The 2015 German Darts Masters was the third of nine PDC European Tour events on the 2015 PDC Pro Tour. The tournament took place in the Ballhausforum, Munich, Germany, between 4–6 April 2015. It featured a field of 48 players and £115,000 in prize money, with £25,000 going to the winner.

Phil Taylor was the defending champion, but he withdrew before the event started due to illness.

Michael van Gerwen won his third consecutive European Tour title in 2015 by defeating John Henderson 6–5 in the final.

Prize money
The prize fund was increased to £115,000 after being £100,000 for the previous two years.

Qualification and format

The top 16 players from the PDC ProTour Order of Merit on 8 March 2015 automatically qualified for the event. The remaining 32 places went to players from three qualifying events - 20 from the UK Qualifier (held in Barnsley on 13 March), eight from the European Qualifier and four from the Host Nation Qualifier (both held at the venue before the day before the event started).

Phil Taylor withdrew due to illness a day before the start of the tournament. Jamie Caven, the highest ranked UK Qualifier, was moved up to the top 16 of the PDC ProTour Order of Merit. Therefore, there was a free place for the Host Nation Qualifier.

The following players took part in the tournament:

Top 16
  Michael van Gerwen (winner)
  Michael Smith (second round)
  James Wade (quarter-finals)
  Peter Wright (semi-finals)
  Robert Thornton (quarter-finals)
  Adrian Lewis (semi-finals)
  Brendan Dolan (quarter-finals)
  Ian White (second round)
  Vincent van der Voort (third round)
  Simon Whitlock (third round)
  Mervyn King (second round)
  Justin Pipe (second round)
  Kim Huybrechts (second round)
  Terry Jenkins (third round)
  Steve Beaton (second round)
  Jamie Caven (third round)

UK Qualifier 
  Ken MacNeil (first round)
  Mickey Mansell (second round)
  Andy Boulton (first round)
  Andrew Gilding (third round)
  David Pallett (second round)
  Daryl Gurney (first round)
  Darren Webster (second round)
  Andy Smith (second round)
  Wes Newton (third round)
  William O'Connor (quarter-finals)
  Dennis Smith (first round)
  John Henderson (runner-up)
  Kurt Parry (second round)
  Gary Stone (second round)
  Josh Payne (first round)
  Lee Palfreyman (first round)
  Keegan Brown (second round)
  Jamie Bain (third round)
  Jamie Lewis (second round)

European Qualifier
  Rowby-John Rodriguez (first round)
  Jan Dekker (first round)
  Ronny Huybrechts (second round)
  Benito van de Pas (second round)
  Jeffrey de Zwaan (first round)
  Armin Glanzer (first round)
  Mensur Suljović (third round)
  Cristo Reyes (first round)

Host Nation Qualifier
  Tomas Seyler (first round)
  Andree Welge (first round)
  Jyhan Artut (first round)
  Daniel Zygla (first round)
  Stefan Stoyke (first round)

Draw

References

2015 PDC European Tour
2015 in German sport